Saller is a surname that may refer to the following people
Benedikt Saller, German association football player
Brandon Saller (born 1983), American drummer and vocalist of post-hardcore band Atreyu
Eugenio Saller (born 1928), Brazilian tennis player

See also
Fischer–Saller scale, used in anthropology and medicine to determine the shades of hair color
Sport-Saller, a German sportswear company